Amelia Bagley (2 October 1870 – 30 January 1956) was a New Zealand hospital matron, midwife and nursing administrator. She was born in Dunedin, New Zealand on 2 October 1870.

Career 
Bagley trained in Dunedin from 1892-1895, first working as a ward sister at Auckland Hospital and then as matron of Masterton Hospital from 1903-1905. In 1905, she became a registered midwife, one of the first trainees at St Helens Hospital in Wellington. She then spent two years private nursing.

From 1908-1911, she was Assistant Inspector of Private Hospitals and Midwives in the Department of Hospitals and Charitable Aid inspecting small maternity hospitals and the practices of traditional midwives. 

Bagley, with Hester Maclean and Jessie Bicknell, had a major role in supervising the implementation of the Midwives Act 1904 and setting midwifery standards. In 1911 the Department of Health launched a Native Health nursing scheme to address the health needs of Maori. Bagley was appointed as a superintendent nurse. In 1913, she went to Ahipara, Northland during typhoid and smallpox epidemics where she set up a temporary hospitals at the local marae and provided nursing care and advice. She established five nursing stations around the country by the end of 1912, and was made Superintendent of Native Health Nurses in 1913. 

Bagley wanted well qualified general and midwifery nurses for the Native Health nursing scheme as they would often be working in isolated areas where they would need to take responsibility and use their initiative. Additional attributes required by Bagley were physical stamina and personal qualities which enabled cooperation with the patients and community.

During World War 1 Bagley served firstly as Assistant Inspector of Hospitals/Civilian and then from 1917 as Matron/Military with the New Zealand Army Nursing Service on the hospital ships "Maheno" and "Marama".  Post-war she developed the Rural Nursing Service in the Auckland Public Health service.

After World War I, Bagley developed a Rural Nursing Service for Auckland Public Health and a post-graduate qualification in rural nursing.

Bagley retired in 1930 and died on 30 January 1956 in Auckland, aged 85.

References

1870 births
1956 deaths
New Zealand midwives
New Zealand military nurses
New Zealand women nurses
People from Dunedin in health professions